The 1991 All Japan Sports Prototype Car Endurance Championship was the ninth season of the All Japan Sports Prototype Championship. The 1991 champion was the #23 Nissan Motorsports Nissan R91CP driven by Kazuyoshi Hoshino and Toshio Suzuki.

Schedule
All races were held in Japan.

Entry list

Season results
Season results as follows:

Point Ranking

Drivers

References

External links
 1991 全日本スポーツプロトタイプカー耐久選手権 

JSPC seasons
Sports Prototype